Polsingen is a municipality  in the Weißenburg-Gunzenhausen district, in Bavaria, Germany.

References

Weißenburg-Gunzenhausen